Margaret Annet Muhanga Mugisa (born 4 June 1967) is a Ugandan politician and member of parliament for North Division in Fort Portal City in the eleventh parliament of Uganda. She is affiliated to the National Resistance Movement. She also served as the Woman representative for Kabarole District in the tenth parliament of Uganda

Education background 
Margaret has a Master's degree

Career 
Margaret worked for New Vision in the 1990s covering parliamentary news. She was the Member of parliament for Burahya in Kabarole District in the tenth parliament of Uganda. She won the 2021 national elections to become the member of parliament for North Division in Fort Portal City. Margaret  supported the lifting of the term limit bill in the tenth parliament.

Margaret sat on the parliamentary Committee on Commissions, State Authorities & State Enterprises.

Personal life 
Margaret  is married to Michael Mugisha and they have children together. She supported schools dropouts and also supported church construction

See also 
 List of members of the eleventh Parliament of Uganda
 Irene Linda Mugisha
 Parliament of Uganda
 National Resistance Movement

References 

Living people
National Resistance Movement politicians
Members of the Parliament of Uganda
Parliament of Uganda
21st-century Ugandan women politicians
21st-century Ugandan politicians
1967 births